Jake Steinfeld (born February 21, 1958) is an American actor, fitness personality, entrepreneur, and producer. He develops businesses through the "Body by Jake" brand.

Early life
Born in the Sea Gate neighborhood of Brooklyn, Steinfeld was raised in Baldwin, New York. He attended the State University of New York College at Cortland before dropping out and moving to Los Angeles.

Career
Steinfeld develops brands and businesses as chairman and CEO of Body by Jake. Previously, Steinfeld created FitTV, a 24-hour fitness lifestyle network, which he later sold to News Corp. Following the sale of FitTV, Steinfeld launched ExerciseTV, a fitness on-demand television network, with partners Comcast, New Balance, and Time Warner.

Steinfeld co-founded Major League Lacrosse (MLL), the first professional outdoor lacrosse league, in 2001. MLL has six franchises in North America; the championship trophy is named the Steinfeld Cup.

Steinfeld is also the founder of the World Series of Youth Lacrosse which provides (U13) youth players a lacrosse experience like that of a professional. This event features teams from the U.S., Europe, Canada, Israel, Iroquois Nation and others competing to play in the championship game aired live on ESPN2 on the Fourth of July.

Teaming with Universal Music Enterprises (UMe), a division of Universal Music Group, Steinfeld formed a music label called Body by Jake Music.

Steinfeld became chairman of the California Governor's Council on Physical Fitness and Sports under Governor Arnold Schwarzenegger in 2006 and served until 2011 under Governor Jerry Brown. He was named chairman of the National Foundation for Governors' Fitness Councils in 2012. Through the cooperation of public and private partnerships, the NFGFC rewards "Don't Quit" fitness centers to elementary and middle schools who show innovative ways to promote fitness and nutrition in their schools and communities across the United States.

Steinfeld was an official Olympic torch bearer for the 2012 Summer Olympics. He served as honorary mayor of Pacific Palisades from 2013 to 2016.

Television and film 
Steinfeld started as a personal trainer with clients including Steven Spielberg and Harrison Ford, whom he trained for Indiana Jones and the Temple of Doom and Indiana Jones and the Last Crusade.

Later, he starred on a sitcom on the Family Channel called Big Brother Jake. Other television credits include King of the Hill, Movin' Mountains, Dream On, The Tracey Ullman Show, Shaping Up and Simon & Simon. In addition, Steinfeld appeared in the fourteenth season of Hell's Kitchen as a guest in episode 12's dinner service.

Steinfeld made his film debut in the 1979 film Americathon. He had the lead role of the killer in the early slasher film Home Sweet Home (1981). Other film roles include Cheech and Chong's Next Movie (1980), Into the Night (1985), The Money Pit (1986), and Coming to America (1988). He supplied the voice of Git, a lab rat in the Disney animated feature Ratatouille and as the Fish Seller in the 2011 English version of From Up On Poppy Hill.

Steinfeld is executive producer of the film The Grizzlies, which won the DGC award for Best Director in Feature Film as well as Audience Awards in Calgary, Minneapolis, and Palm Springs Film Festivals.

Writing 
Steinfeld is a New York Times and Wall Street Journal best-selling author. He has authored and co-authored books including Body by Jake (1984); Don't Quit; Get Strong! Body by Jake's Guide to Building Confidence, Muscles and a Great Future for Teenage Guys (2002); I've Seen a Lot of Famous People Naked and They've Got Nothing on You! (2005); and Take A Shot!, A Remarkable Story of Perseverance, Friendship, and a Really Crazy Adventure (2012).

Personal life
Steinfeld and his wife have four children. He is of Jewish descent and is the uncle of actress/singer Hailee Steinfeld.

Filmography

Film

Television

References

External links
 
 Hause, Irene [L.]. (1981, July). Jake Steinfeld: Movie-Makin’ Muscleman. Muscle & Bodybuilder, 3(11), pp. 14–18, 54. (Retrieved November 16, 2008.)

1958 births
American exercise instructors
Jewish American male actors
Living people
Major League Lacrosse
People from Baldwin, Nassau County, New York
People from Sea Gate, Brooklyn
State University of New York at Cortland alumni
21st-century American Jews